Cruiser 'Varyag' is a 1946 Soviet war film directed by Viktor Eisymont.

Plot 
January 27, 1904 the command of the Japanese squadron, which approached the neutral Korean port Chemulpo, offers Russian ships — cruiser Varyag and gunboat Korietz — to leave the port. Russian sailors, not receiving support from the commanders of ships of foreign powers, decide to go to sea and fight the Japanese squadron.

Cast
 Boris Livanov as Rudnev, Commander of the Cruiser the 'Varyag'
 Aleksandr Zrazhevsky as Belyaev,  Commander of the Canon Boat the 'Korietz'
 Nikolai Chaplygin as Bobylev  
 Vyacheslav Novikov as Antonych 
 Vsevolod Larionov as Dorofeyev  
 Georgy Petrovsky as Pavlov 
 Nadir Malishevsky as Musatov  
 Mikhail Sadovsky as Muromsky
 Lev Sverdlin as Japan consul  
 Nikolai Bubnov as Father Paisy  
 Sergei Tsenin as French Commander  
 Lev Potyomkin as Korean postman  
 Rostislav Plyatt as Beily. 
 Yulia Tsay as Marusya
  as Marine Officer

Awards
 Stalin Prize (1947)

References

External links 
 
 Cruiser 'Varyag' on KinoPoisk
 Kreiser Varyag on YouTube, Russian language only

1946 films
1940s Russian-language films
Gorky Film Studio films
1940s war drama films
Soviet war drama films
Soviet black-and-white films
1946 drama films
Films set in 1904